Nathan Wood may refer to:
Nathan Wood (rugby league) (born 1972), Australian rugby league player
Nathan Wood (cricketer) (born 1974), English cricketer
Nathan Wood (footballer) (born 2002), English footballer

See also
Nathan Wood House, Westminster, Massachusetts